DW4 may refer to:

Digimon World 4
Dragon Warrior 4
Dynasty Warriors 4